Pfrondorf is part of the city of Tübingen and the district of Tübingen within the state of Baden-Württemberg in Germany. It lies at the edge of the Schönbuch nature park on a hill.

Pfrondorf lies 424m above sea level. It has 3,300 inhabitants (2005 est.).

External links 

  
 War memorial in Pfrondorf at sites-of-memory.de

Towns in Baden-Württemberg